Mistake Island is an island in Washington County, in the U.S. state of Maine. The island contains little vegetation. Mistake Island has been noted for its unusual place name.

Moose Peak Light stands high atop Mistake Island. The lighthouse is closed to general visitors.

References

Islands of Washington County, Maine
Islands of Maine
Coastal islands of Maine